The  River Cong is a short river of moderate flow in Ireland, primarily in County Mayo but also touching County Galway.

Course
The river rises by the village of Cong, County Mayo. It is divided by an island at one point. It flows strongly past Ashford Castle and into Lough Corrib.

Recreation  
The river is popular with fishermen, having a State salmon hatchery and a strong spring salmon run. The peak of the spring run is in April and then the grilse come in May. June to early July are particularly good, and salmon are taken in lesser numbers for the rest of the season. The river also holds stocks of ferox trout (brown trout). The upper stretch has open access, while the lower part is managed by Ashford Castle, and local gillies are available.

Cong Canal
In 1848 there was an attempt to link Lough Mask and Lough Corrib with a canal, running from Lough Mask south to Cong, and then continuing to the east of the river. The work continued during summer months for five years but was badly managed. Although all three miles of excavation and two of the three planned locks were completed, the project was stopped in 1854. Swallow holes had been found in the limestone and these were later blamed for the abandonment by Sir William Wilde in his book about Lough Corrib, although the canal is not known to have ever been watered, and competition from the railways was probably a more important reason.

References

Cong
Cong